Inverted sugar syrup, also called invert syrup, invert sugar, simple syrup, sugar syrup, sugar water, bar syrup, syrup USP, or sucrose inversion, is a syrup mixture of the monosaccharides glucose and fructose, that is made by hydrolytic saccharification of the disaccharide sucrose. This mixture's optical rotation is opposite to that of the original sugar, which is why it is called an invert sugar.

It is sweeter than table sugar, and foods that contain invert sugar retain moisture better and crystallize less easily than do those that use table sugar instead. Bakers, who call it invert syrup, may use it more than other sweeteners.

Production

Plain water
Inverted sugar syrup can be made without acids or enzymes by heating it up alone: two parts granulated sugar and one part water, simmered for five to seven minutes, will be partly inverted.

The amount of water can be increased to increase the time it takes to reach the desired final temperature, and increasing the time increases the amount of inversion that occurs. In general, higher final temperatures result in thicker syrups, and lower final temperatures, in thinner ones.

Additives
The optimum pH for inversion is 5.0. Invertase is added at a rate of about 0.15% of the syrup's weight, and inversion time will be about 8 hours. When completed the syrup temperature is raised to inactivate the invertase, but the syrup is concentrated in a vacuum evaporator to preserve color.

Though inverted sugar syrup can be made by heating table sugar in water alone, the reaction can be sped up by adding lemon juice,  cream of tartar, or other catalysts, often without changing the flavor noticeably. Common sugar can be inverted quickly by mixing sugar and citric acid or cream of tartar at a ratio of about 1000:1 by weight and adding water. If lemon juice which is about five percent citric acid by weight is used instead then the ratio becomes 50:1.

The optimum pH for acid-catalyzed inversion is 2.15. As the inversion temperature is increased, the inversion time decreases. They are then given a pH neutralization when the desired level of inversion is reached.

In confectionery and candy making, cream of tartar is commonly used as the acidulant, with typical amounts in the range of 0.15–0.25% of the sugar's weight. The use of cream of tartar imparts a honey-like flavor to the syrup. After the inversion is completed, it may be neutralized with baking soda using a weight of 45% of the cream of tartar's weight.

For fermentation

All constituent sugars (sucrose, glucose, and fructose) support fermentation, so invert sugar solutions of any composition can be fermented.

Syrup is used to feed microbiological life, which requires oxygen found in the water. For example, kombucha is produced by fermenting inverted sugar syrup with tea using a symbiotic culture of bacteria and yeast (SCOBY), and yeast in winemaking is used for ethanol fermentation. Cold water can hold more dissolved oxygen than warm water, but granulated sugar does not dissolve easily in cold water. 

Water in a container with wide bottom surface area improves the solubility of the sucrose, which only has to be mixed a few times periodically to form a homogeneous solution. Also, a mixer or blender may be used to rotate the sugar, in turns, if necessary.

In other foods and products

Honey which is mostly a mixture of glucose and fructose, being similar to invert syrup therefore, can remain a liquid for longer periods of time.
Jam contains invert sugar formed by the heating process and the acid content of the fruit. This sugar preserves the jam for long periods of time.
Golden syrup is a syrup of about 55% invert syrup and 45% table sugar (sucrose).
Fondant filling for chocolates is unique in that the conversion enzyme is added, but not activated by acidification (microenvironment pH adjustment) or cofactor addition depending on the enzyme(s), before the filling is enrobed with chocolate.  The very viscous (and thus formable) filling then becomes less viscous with time, giving the creamy consistency desired. This results from the sub-optimal enzyme(s) conditions purposely created by withholding activation factors, which allows only a fraction of the enzyme(s) to be active, or allows all enzyme(s) to proceed at only a fraction of the biological rate [biologically, it's realistically a combination of both: a reduced number of functional enzymes, with the ones that do function having reduced catalytic kinetics/rates].
Cadbury Creme Eggs are filled with inverted sugar syrup produced by processing fondant with invertase.
Sour Patch Kids also contain inverted sugar to add sweet flavor.

Sweetened beverages
Inverted sugar syrup is the basis in sweetened beverages.

 Sweet reserve is a wine term referring to a portion of selected unfermented grape must, free of microorganisms, to be added to wine as a sweetening component. When wine ferments, glucose is fermented at a faster rate than fructose. Thus, arresting fermentation after a significant portion of the sugars have fermented results in a wine where the residual sugar consists mainly of fructose, while the use of Süssreserve will result in a wine where the sweetness comes from a mixture of glucose and fructose. 
 Alcoholic beverage manufacturers often add invert sugar in the production of drinks like gin, beer and sparkling wines for flavoring. Candi sugar, similar to invert sugar, is used in the brewing of Belgian-style beers to boost alcohol content without drastically increasing the body of the beer; it is frequently found in the styles of beer known as dubbel and tripel.

Chemistry

Table sugar (sucrose) is converted to invert sugar by hydrolysis. Heating a mixture or solution of table sugar and water breaks the chemical bond that links together the two simple-sugar components.

The balanced chemical equation for the hydrolysis of sucrose into glucose and fructose is:

C12H22O11 (sucrose) + H2O (water) → C6H12O6 (glucose) + C6H12O6 (fructose)

Optical rotation 
Once a sucrose solution has had some of its sucrose turned into glucose and fructose the solution is no longer said to be pure. The gradual decrease in purity of a sucrose solution as it is hydrolyzed affects a chemical property of the solution called optical rotation that can be used to figure out how much of the sucrose has been hydrolyzed and therefore whether the solution has been inverted or not.

Definition and measurement 
Plane polarized light can be shone through a sucrose solution as it is heated up for hydrolysis. Such light has an 'angle' that can be measured using a tool called a polarimeter. When such light is shone through a solution of pure sucrose it comes out the other side with a different angle than when it entered, which is proportional to both the concentration of the sugar and the length of the path of light through the solution; its angle is therefore said to be 'rotated' and how many degrees the angle has changed (the degree of its rotation or its 'optical rotation') is given a letter name,  (alpha).

Definition of the inversion point 
When plane polarized light enters and exits a solution of pure sucrose its angle is rotated 66.5° (clockwise or to the right). As the sucrose is heated up and hydrolyzed the amount of glucose and fructose in the mixture increases and the optical rotation decreases. After  passes zero and becomes a negative optical rotation, meaning that the rotation between the angle the light has when it enters and when it exits is in the counter clockwise direction, it is said that the optical rotation has 'inverted' its direction. This leads to the definition of an 'inversion point' as the per cent amount sucrose that has to be hydrolyzed before  equals zero. Any solution which has passed the inversion point (and therefore has a negative value of ) is said to be 'inverted'.

Chirality and specific rotation 
As the shapes of the molecules ('chemical structures') of sucrose, glucose, and fructose are all asymmetrical the three sugars come in several different forms, called stereoisomers. The existence of these forms is what gives rise to these chemicals' optical properties. When plane polarized light passes through a pure solution of one of these forms of one of the sugars it is thought to hit and 'glance off' certain asymmetrical chemical bonds within the molecule of that form of that sugar. Because those particular bonds (which in cyclic sugars like sucrose, glucose, and fructose include an anomeric bond) are different in each form of the sugar, each form rotates the light to a different degree.

When any one form of a sugar is purified and put in water, it rapidly takes other forms of the same sugar. This means that a solution of a pure sugar normally has all of its stereoisomers present in the solution in different amounts which usually do not change much.

In the circumstance of 20 °C, the specific optical rotation of sucrose is known to be 66.6°, glucose is 52.2°, and fructose is −92.4°.

Effects of water 
Water molecules do not have chirality, therefore they do not have any effect on the measurement of optical rotation. When plane polarized light enters a body of pure water its angle is no different than when it exits. Thus, for water,  = 0°. Chemicals that, like water, have specific rotations that equal zero degrees are called 'optically inactive' chemicals and like water, they do not need to be considered when calculating optical rotation, outside of the concentration and path length.

Mixtures in general 
The overall optical rotation of a mixture of chemicals can be calculated if the proportion of the amount of each chemical in the solution is known.

Fully hydrolyzed sucrose 
Assuming no extra chemical products are formed by accident (that is, there are no side reactions) a completely hydrolyzed sucrose solution no longer has any sucrose and is a half-and-half mixture of glucose and fructose. This solution has the optical rotation

Partly hydrolyzed sucrose 

The particular values of  do not need to be known to make use of this equation as the inversion point (per cent amount of sucrose that must be hydrolyzed before the solution is inverted) can be calculated from the specific rotation angles of the pure sugars. The reaction stoichiometry (the fact that hydrolyzing one sucrose molecule makes one glucose molecule and one fructose molecule) shows that when a solution begins with  moles of sucrose and no glucose nor fructose and  moles of sucrose are then hydrolyzed the resulting solution has  moles of sucrose,  moles of glucose and  moles of fructose. The total number of moles of sugars in the solution is therefore and the reaction progress (per cent completion of the hydrolysis reaction) equals . It can be shown that the solution's optical rotation angle is a function of (explicitly depends on) this per cent reaction progress.

By definition,  equals zero degrees at the 'inversion point'; to find the inversion point, therefore, alpha is set equal to zero and the equation is manipulated to find . This givesThus it is found that a sucrose solution is inverted once at least  of the sucrose has been hydrolyzed into glucose and fructose.

Monitoring reaction progress 
Holding a sucrose solution at temperatures of  hydrolyzes no more than about 85% of its sucrose. Finding  when r = 0.85 shows that the optical rotation of the solution after hydrolysis is done is −12.7° this reaction is said to invert the sugar because its final optical rotation is less than zero. A polarimeter can be used to figure out when the inversion is done by detecting whether the optical rotation of the solution at an earlier time in its hydrolysis reaction equals −12.7°.

See also
 High-fructose corn syrup
 List of syrups

References

External links

Brewing ingredients
Monosaccharides
Food science
Sugars
Syrup